Joseph Rowntree may refer to:

Joseph Rowntree (Senior) (1801–1859), English grocer and educational reformer
Joseph Rowntree (philanthropist) (1836–1925), son of the above, English chocolate manufacturer and philanthropist
Joseph Rowntree (Canadian) (fl. 1843), Canadian pioneer and mill owner